The Clocktower Centre, previously known as Essendon Town Hall or Moonee Ponds Town Hall, is a civic building in Moonee Ponds in Melbourne, Australia. Operated by the City of Moonee Valley, it is a venue for performing arts as well as community and corporate activities. It is located at 750 Mount Alexander Road, at the junction with Pascoe Vale Road.

Building history

The building has evolved substantially over time. It was originally built as the Essendon Mechanics Institute, in a Victorian architecture style and opening in September 1880.

In February 1886 it was officially rechristened as the Essendon Town Hall. By 1914 the town hall had been extended and was reopened in July of that year. In 1930, a clock was installed in the clocktower and in 1941 the building was again modified with sections being rebuilt.

After the council chambers were moved to the new civic centre in 1973, the town hall was converted to a community centre. It was renovated and officially opened as the Essendon Community Centre in 1976. A fire in 1978 caused substantial internal damage to the building but by 1979 it had been repaired and reopened.

In February 2000 following substantial renovations, the building was officially reopened as the Clocktower Centre.

See also
List of Town Halls in Melbourne

References

External links
Clocktower Centre
The City of Moonee Valley History Online: Clocktower Centre History
Picture Australia: Town Hall, Moonee Ponds ca. 1908.

Town halls in Melbourne
Victorian architecture in Victoria (Australia)
1880 establishments in Australia
Buildings and structures in the City of Moonee Valley
Essendon, Victoria
Clock towers in Australia
Government buildings completed in 1880